Elections to Medway Council were  held on 2 May 2019 as part of the 2019 United Kingdom local elections. The elections were for all 55 councillors across 22 wards.

Result

|-

Council Composition
Prior to the election, the composition of the council was:

After the election, the composition of the council was:

Ward results 
Asterisks denote incumbent Councillors seeking re-election. A total of 199 candidates stood for the 55 seats available.

Chatham Central

Cuxton and Halling

Gillingham North

Gillingham South

Les Wicks was elected as a Conservative councillor in Rainham South in 2015.

Hempstead and Wigmore

Lordswood and Capstone

Luton and Wayfield

Sam Craven was elected as a Labour councillor in 2015. Mike Franklin was elected as a Conservative councillor in 2015.

Peninsula

Mick Pendergast was elected as a UKIP councillor in 2015.

Princes Park

Rainham Central

Rainham North

Rainham South

River

Rochester East

Rochester South and Horsted

Rochester West

Strood North

Strood Rural

Strood South

Twydall

Mark Joy was elected as a UKIP councillor in Strood South in 2015.

Walderslade

Watling

By-elections

Princes Park

Strood North

Rochester East

Peninsula

References

2019 English local elections
2019
May 2019 events in the United Kingdom
2010s in Kent